The Chinese famine of 1928–1930 occurred as widespread drought hit Northwestern and Northern China, most notably in the provinces of Henan, Shaanxi and Gansu. Mortality is estimated to be within 6 million, which already included deaths from famine-led diseases. The inefficiency of relief has been pointed out as a factor which aggravated the famine.

Death toll

Gansu's population in 1922 was 6,403,339, before the famine struck in 1928 its population likely reached 7 million. Of which, an estimate of 2.5-3.0 million of Gansu people died. Shaanxi's population in 1928 was 11,802,446, an estimate of 3 million died. In total 6 million died. Some put the mortality as high as 10 million.

See also
 List of famines in China

References

1928 in China
1929 in China
1930 in China
1928
20th-century famines
Disasters in Shaanxi
Disasters in Henan
Disasters in Gansu